State Temple of the Martial God, also called Tainan Sacrificial Rites Martial Temple or Grand Guandi Temple, is a temple located in Yongfu Road, West Central District, Tainan, Taiwan. This temple was previously the palace of Koxinga and Prince of Ningjing, members of the Ming imperial family who retreated to Taiwan in the dying days of the Ming dynasty.

This temple is dedicated to the deity Guan Gong. The statue of Guan-Gong in this temple was brought to Taiwan from Fujian Province, China by relatives of Prince of Ningjing during the Ming dynasty.

There are also some minor temples as well:
 Two smaller temples of Guanyin who is a Buddhist fertility goddess. 
 The temple of Yue Lao, where single people pray for luck to find their soul mate.
 A horse-god temple located across the Yong-Fu Road. 

The horse-god takes the form of a soldier who looks after the horses. Because Guan-Gong was always assisted in his work by horses, his followers build this temple to show their respect and appreciation.

History
The temple was built in 1663 by Zheng Jing, eldest son of Koxinga. It was renovated, modified, and expanded in 1690. It was renovated and expanded once more which leads to its present form in 1716. A shrine for 3 generations of Guan Yu's family was added in 1725 for their worship, and in 1727, the temple's status was elevated to that of an official temple.

Features 

The State Temple of the Martial God is a typical Southern Ming building style temple, a building style that could be found in Fujian Province around the Ming dynasty.

Wall 
The first noticeable feature of this temple is the long, high, red wall along Yung-Fu Road, called a “horseback style wall”, named for its appearance which is similar to a horse's bare back.

Five Roofs 
Looking above the wall, five different kinds of roofs are visible.
The style of the most decorated one is called “swallows tail” and is also typical of the “Southern Ming” building style.
As with other traditional temples, the roofs of Tainan Sacrificial Rites Martial Temple also decorated with dragons.

Door Knobs 
At the main entrance of the temple, there are three red doors.
The larger, central door is decorated with 72 studs, and the other two smaller doors have 54 studs in each.
These are all multiples of 9 as “9” is a royal symbolic number, and this temple was previously the palace of Koxinga and Prince of Ningjing, members of the Ming royal family who retreated to Taiwan in the dying days of the Ming dynasty.

Animals feature decorated 
Above the entrance, carvings of a number of animals, including elephants, dragons, and the mythical Chinese flying creature “Qilin” (which has a head like a dragon, and the body of a winged horse), are visible. These animals are placed here to protect the temple and ward off evil. At the meeting points of columns and beams are lotus shaped decorations. These decorations conceal studs that secure the beams’ structure, as no nails were reputedly used in the temple's construction.

Historical Name Plates 
There are many famous and historical name plates in the temple. Immediately on entering the temple and located above the door is large nameplate with the three Chinese characters “Da Zhang Fu” (大丈夫) carved in it. In Chinese culture, “Da Zhang Fu” represents courage, strength, and loyalty, the traits of Guan-Gong. This name plate was presented to the temple by a Qing dynasty general in A.D. 1791.

Statues of Guan Gong 
Beyond the entrance courtyard, is the main altar of Guan Gong, or Lord Guan. The statue of Guan Gong in this temple was brought to Taiwan from Fu-Chien Province, China, by relatives of the Prince of Ningjing during the Ming dynasty, and has remained here ever since.

Statues of Guan Gong's Son and Bodyguard 
To the right of the statue of Guan Gong, in a red and gold robe, is Guan Gong’s son, Guan Ping. On the left, holding a huge weapon and wearing a fearsome expression, is Zhou Cang, fabled to be Guan Gong’s loyal general and bodyguard. On hearing of Guan Gong’s death, he immediately committed suicide as a further demonstration of his loyalty.

Window Decoration 
There are passages past the altar on either side. The windows along the passages are shaped like traditional Chinese coins – a circular shape and a square hole in the middle. When the sun shines through the windows, the floor seems to be covered with money. Guan-Gong is reported to have advised his followers to spend every coin wisely, and not to waste money: this may be why he has become the patron saint of accountants.

Guanyin Statue 
To the rear and the left of the first part of the temple, is another, smaller temple. This is the temple of Guan-Yin. Although Guan-Yin is a Buddhist goddess, Taoists associate her with fertility, and her image can be found in nearly every Taoist temple. This particular statue is famous because of the smiling, benevolent expression on her face. Her eyes are slightly downcast, and appear to be looking at the visitors.

On either side of the Guan Yin Temple there is a row of 9 Buddhist monks, called “18 arhats”, who are the protectors of Buddhist gods.

The Examination Gods 
Outside the Guan-Yin temple, and to the left, is the temple of the five examination gods, where students and examinees pray for good luck in examinations. The students and examinees write their names, and the time and place of their examination on slip of pink paper. If they pass the exam or get an acceptable grade in the exam, they will often come back and hang a red string decoration as a sign of gratitude, or worship and present flowers and fresh fruit in appreciation.

Yue Lao Temple 
On the opposite side of the Guanyin temple is the “Yue Lao” temple. Single people visit here and pray for luck to find their soul mate: if successful, they usually bring wedding cake and fruit to the temple in appreciation.

Read Courtyard 
Behind the Guanyin temple is a small courtyard, and to the right of the courtyard is the temple where the god of fire is worshiped. Every Saturday, a traditional Chinese music group used to practice and perform traditional Chinese music here. This courtyard also contains a small fish pond: Small goldfish are often kept in Taoist temples because they are believed to bring prosperity (gold=money) to the people. A plum tree is reputed to be more than 300 years old, and in the old days people would sit beneath it and compose poetry, play musical instruments ,or enjoy wine in its shade.

Ma Shi Ye (The Horse God Temple) 
Nearly every Guan-Gong Temple has a horse–god temple associated with it. The horse-god temple here is located across the Yong-Fu Road, where the road curves opposite the entrance to the Guan-Gong temple. The horse-god takes the form of a soldier who looks after the horses. Because Guan-Gong was always assisted in his work by horses, his followers built this temple to show their respect and appreciation.

See also 
Martial Temple
Wen Wu temple
 Beiji Temple
 Grand Matsu Temple
 Taiwan Confucian Temple
 Madou Daitian Temple
 Temple of the Five Concubines
 List of temples in Taiwan

References

1663 establishments in Taiwan
Guandi temples
Taoist temples in Tainan
National monuments of Taiwan